Isami Ishii ( Ishii Isami; 8 December 1941 – 17 September 2022) was a Japanese manga artist. He was mainly known for writing the manga 750 Rider and Kutabare!! Namida-kun.

Works
Nora Inu no Oka
Kutabare!! Namida-kun (1970)
Aoi Tori no Densetsu (1972)
Banchou Ace (1972)
Goromaki Ken (1973)
Koukou Akumyouden (1974)
750 Rider (1975)
Zakuro no Hana (1976)
Shikakui Aozora (1978)
Kenka no Seisho (1979)
Ashita ni Makatte Nagero! (1980)
Ryuu ga Kiru! (1980)
Kaze to Ore-tachi (1980)
Tsume Ato (1984)
Hashire!! Mio (1984)
Tic Tak (1985)
750 Rock (1986)
Neppuu Sensei (1988)

References

1941 births
2022 deaths
Manga artists from Tokyo
People from Ōta, Tokyo